I Corps ("First Corps") was an army corps in existence as an active formation in the British Army for most of the 80 years from its creation in the First World War until the end of the Cold War, longer than any other corps. It had a short-lived precursor during the Waterloo Campaign.

Napoleonic precursor

Assembling an army in Belgium to fight Napoleon's resurgent forces in the spring of 1815, the Duke of Wellington formed it into army corps, deliberately mixing units from the Anglo-Hanoverian, Dutch-Belgian and German contingents so that the weaker elements would be stiffened by more experienced or reliable troops. As he put it: 'It was necessary to organize these troops in brigades, divisions, and corps d’armee with those better disciplined and more accustomed to war'. He placed I Corps under the command of the Prince of Orange and it was this corps that was first contacted by the advancing French at Quatre Bras on 16 June 1815. However, Wellington did not employ the corps as tactical entities, and continued his accustomed practice of issuing orders directly to divisional and lower commanders. When he drew up his army on the ridge at Waterloo, elements of the various corps were mixed up, and although he gave the Prince of Orange nominal command of the centre, that officer had different forces under him. Subsequent to the battle, the corps structure was re-established for the advance into France, I Corps being commanded by Maj-Gen Sir John Byng, the Prince of Orange having been wounded at Waterloo.

Composition of I Corps in the Waterloo Campaign

General Officer Commanding (GOC): General The Prince of Orange
 1st (British) Division (British Guards)
 3rd (British) Division (Anglo-Hanoverian)
 2nd (Netherlands) Division (Dutch-Belgian)
 3rd (Netherlands) Division (Dutch-Belgian)

Prior to the First World War

After Waterloo the army corps structure largely disappeared from the British Army, except for ad hoc formations assembled during annual manoeuvres (e.g. Army Manoeuvres of 1913). In 1876 a Mobilisation Scheme for eight army corps was published, with 'First Corps' based on Colchester. In 1880 First Corps' organization was:
 1st Division (Colchester)
 1st Brigade (Colchester)
 1st Bn. 2nd Foot (Colchester), 1st Bn. 10th Foot (Colchester)
 2nd Brigade (Colchester)
 1st Bn. 9th Foot (Kinsale), 28th Foot (Fermoy)
 Divisional Troops
 2nd Bn. 12th Foot (Portsmouth), Buckinghamshire Yeomanry (Buckingham), 1st Company Royal Engineers (Shorncliffe)
 Artillery
 F/1st Brigade Royal Artillery (Ipswich), D/1st Brigade RA (Woolwich)
 2nd Division (Chelmsford)
 1st Brigade (Chelmsford)
 1st Bn. 15th Foot (Tipperary), 47th Foot (The Curragh)
 2nd Brigade (Warley)
 1st Bn. 3rd Foot (Shorncliffe), 49th Foot (Dover), 55th Foot (Shorncliffe)
 Divisional Troops
 1st Bn. 23rd Foot (Woolwich), Hertfordshire Yeomanry (St Albans), 20th Company Royal Engineers (Chatham)
 Artillery
 I/4th Brigade RA (Newcastle), N/4th Brigade RA (Woolwich), M/4th Brigade RA (Newcastle)
 3rd Division (Gravesend)
 1st Brigade (Gravesend)
 77th Foot (Dublin), 104th Foot (Belfast), 105th Foot (Newry)
 2nd Brigade (Chatham)
 2nd Bn. 5th Foot (Chatham), 31st Foot (Chatham), 86th Foot (Chatham)
 Divisional Troops
 87th Foot (Limerick), West Kent Yeomanry (Maidstone), 22nd Company Royal Engineers (Woolwich)
 Artillery
 O/4th Brigade RA (Weedon), A/5th Brigade RA (Weedon)
 Cavalry Brigade (Maldon)
 3rd Hussars (Colchester), 4th Hussars (Shorncliffe), Suffolk Yeomanry (Bury St Edmunds), F Battery C Brigade Royal Horse Artillery (Canterbury)
 Corps Artillery (Colchester)
 E Battery C Brigade RHA (Woolwich), H Battery A Brigade RHA (Woolwich)
 G/1st Brigade RA (Woolwich), B/5th Brigade RA (Sheffield)
 Corps Engineers (Colchester)
 A (Pontoons) Troop Royal Engineer Train (Aldershot)
 C (Telegraph) Troop Royal Engineer Train (Aldershot)
 23rd Company Royal Engineers and Field Park (Chatham)

This scheme had been dropped by 1881. The Stanhope Memorandum of 1891 (drawn up by Edward Stanhope when Secretary of State for War) laid down the policy that after providing for garrisons and India, the army should be able to mobilise three army corps for home defence, two of regular troops and one partly of militia, each of three divisions. Only after those commitments, it was hoped, might two army corps be organised for the unlikely eventuality of deployment abroad.

When the Second Anglo-Boer War was imminent in September 1899, a field army, referred to as the Army Corps (sometimes I Army Corps) was mobilised and sent to Cape Town. It was, in fact, 'about the equivalent of the First Army Corps of the existing mobilization scheme', and was placed under the command of Gen Sir Redvers Buller, General Officer Commanding-in-Chief of Aldershot Command. However, once in South Africa the corps never operated as such, and the three divisions (1st, 2nd and 3rd) were widely dispersed.

The 1901 Army Estimates introduced by St John Brodrick allowed for six army corps based on the six regional commands (Aldershot, Southern, Irish, Eastern, Northern and Scottish) of which only I Corps (Aldershot Command) and II Corps (Southern Command on Salisbury Plain) would be entirely formed of regular troops. However, these arrangements remained theoretical, the title 'I Corps' being added to Aldershot Command. In early October 1902 a memorandum was issued showing the organization and allocation of the 1st Army Corps, to which Sir John French had recently been appointed in command:
 1st Division
 1st Brigade (Guards) (Marlborough Lines)
 2nd Infantry Brigade (HQ Blackdown)
 One squadron of cavalry, two brigade divisions Royal Field Artillery, an ammunition column, a field company Royal Engineers, one company Army Service Corps, a field hospital
 2nd Division
 3rd Infantry Brigade (HQ Stanhope Lines)
 4th Infantry Brigade (HQ Wellington)
 One squadron of cavalry, two brigade divisions Royal Field Artillery, an ammunition column, a field company Royal Engineers, one company Army Service Corps, a field hospital
 3rd Division
 5th Infantry Brigade (HQ Bordon)
 6th Infantry Brigade (HQ Bordon)
 One squadron of cavalry, two brigade divisions Royal Field Artillery, an ammunition column, a field company Royal Engineers, one company Army Service Corps, a field hospital
 1st Cavalry Brigade (South Cavalry Barracks)

In 1907 the title changed to 'Aldershot Corps' but reverted to simply 'Aldershot Command' the following year. Finally, the Haldane Reforms of 1907 established a six-division British Expeditionary Force for deployment overseas, but only Aldershot Command possessed two infantry divisions and a full complement of 'army troops' to form an army corps in the field.

First World War
Pre-war planning for the British Expeditionary Force (BEF) did not envisage any intermediate headquarters between GHQ and the six infantry divisions, but it was assumed that if corps HQs became necessary, then the GOC Aldershot Command would automatically become GOC I Corps in the field. On mobilisation in August 1914 the decision was made to conform to the two-division army corps organisation employed by the French armies alongside which the BEF was to operate. Sir Douglas Haig, then commanding at Aldershot, therefore took I Corps HQ to France with 1st Division and 2nd Division under command, and it remained on the Western Front throughout the war.  It had a peripheral part at the Battle of Mons, then saw hard fighting at the Battle of the Aisne and First Battle of Ypres in 1914, at the Battle of Aubers Ridge in the Spring of 1915 and alongside the Canadian Corps at the Battle of Hill 70, as well in many other large battles of the First World War.

Composition of I Corps in First World War

The composition of army corps changed frequently. Some representative orders of battle for I Corps are given here.

Order of Battle at Mons 23 August 1914

General Officer Commanding: Lieut-Gen Sir Douglas Haig
 Brigadier-General, General Staff (BGGS): J.E. Gough VC
 Brigadier-General, Royal Artillery: H.S. Horne
 Colonel, Royal Engineers: Brig-Gen Spring R. Rice
 1st Division
 2nd Division
 Army Troops attached (20 August 1914)
 1st Army HQ Signal Company, Royal Engineers
 D (Air Line) Section
 G, K & L (Cable) Sections
 No 2 Section, 1st Printing Company, Royal Engineers
 No 1 Bridging Train, Royal Engineers
 B Squadron, North Irish Horse
 Company, 1st Bn Cameron Highlanders
 B & C Sections, No 19 Field Ambulance, RAMC

By the time of the battles of Aubers Ridge and Festubert (May 1915), I Corps still had 1st and 2nd Divisions under command, but had been reinforced by 47th (1/2nd London) Division of the Territorial Force, and 1st Canadian Division. Once the era of trench warfare had set in on the Western Front (1915–17), the BEF left its army corps in position for long periods, so that they became familiar with their sector, while rotating divisions as they required rest, training, or transfer to other sectors.

From May 1916 to August 1917, I Corps Cavalry Regiment was provided by the 1st South Irish Horse.

On 25 September 1918, for the final battles, I Corps was transferred from First Army to Sir William Birdwood's Fifth Army.

'Order of Battle during the final advance in Artois 2 October-11 November 1918Official History 1918 Volume 5, p 125 and Appendix I

General Officer Commanding: Lieut-Gen Sir Arthur Holland
BGGS: Brig-Gen G.V. Hordern
Deputy Adjutant & Quartermaster-General: Brig-Gen N.G. Anderson
Commander, Royal Artillery: Brig-Gen H.C. Sheppard
Commander, Heavy Artillery: Brig-Gen F.G. Maunsell
Commander, Engineers: Brig-Gen H.W. Gordon
 15th (Scottish) Division
 16th (Irish) Division
 55th (West Lancashire) Division (transferred to III Corps on 8 October)
 58th (2/1st London) Division (transferred from VIII Corps/First Army on 14 October).
 Royal Engineers
 133rd Army Troops Company
 135th Army Troops Company
 290th (Staffordshire) Army Troops Company
 556th (Glamorgan) Army Troops Company
 170th Tunnelling Company
 3rd Australian Tunnelling Company
 'A' Corps Signal Company
 5 and 85 (Motor) Airline Sections
 K and AN Cable Sections

Second World War

Battle of France

During the Second World War, I Corps' first assignment was again to the British Expeditionary Force (BEF) where it was commanded by General Sir John Dill, and then Lieutenant General Michael Barker from April 1940. After the Germans broke through Allied lines in the Battle of France in May 1940, the BEF was forced to retreat to Dunkirk for evacuation to England. The Commander-in-Chief (C-in-C) of the BEF, General Lord Gort, ordered Barker to form the rearguard with I Corps to cover the evacuation, and surrender to the Germans as a last resort. However, the acting commander of II Corps, Major General Bernard Montgomery, advised Gort that Barker was in an unfit state to be left in final command, and recommended that Major General Harold Alexander of the 1st Division should be put in charge. Gort did as Montgomery advised, and in the event the bulk of I Corps was successfully evacuated. As Montgomery recalled: '"Alex" got everyone away in his own calm and confident manner'.

Composition of I Corps in the Battle of France
The order of battle was as follows:
General Officer Commanding: Lieutenant General M.G.H. Barker
 1st Infantry Division
 2nd Infantry Division
 48th (South Midland) Infantry Division
 Royal Artillery
 27th Army Field Regiment (21/24 & 37/47 Batteries)
 140th (5th London) Army Field Regiment (366 (10th London) & 367 (11th London) Batteries)
 3rd Medium Regiment (2/11 & 6/10 Batteries)
 5th Medium Regiment (15/17 & 20/21 Batteries)
 52nd (East Lancashire) Light Anti-Aircraft Regiment (154, 155 & 156 Batteries)
 2nd Light Anti-Aircraft Battery
 1st Survey Regiment
 I Corps Troops, Royal Engineers
 102nd, 107th, 221st Army Field Companies
 105th Corps Field Park Company
 13th Corps Field Survey Company
 Infantry—Machine Gun
 2nd Battalion, Cheshire Regiment
 4th Battalion, Cheshire Regiment
 2nd Battalion, Manchester Regiment

North-West Europe
After returning to England I Corps then remained in the United Kingdom, based at Hickleton Hall in South Yorkshire within Northern Command on anti-invasion duties, preparing defences to repel a German invasion of the United Kingdom.

I Corps, now commanded by Lieutenant General John Crocker, then took part in the Normandy landings on 6 June 1944 where, along with XXX Corps, under Lieutenant General Gerard Bucknall (who had commanded I Corps between April and August 1943), it was a spearhead corps of Lieutenant General Miles Dempsey's British Second Army, itself part of the 21st Army Group. The corps was then involved in the Battle of Normandy in fierce attritional fighting for control of the Normandy beachhead. After fighting for two months in the Battle for Caen, I Corps was subordinated on 1 August 1944 to the Canadian First Army, commanded by Lieutenant General Harry Crerar, for the remainder of the Normandy campaign  and the subsequent operations in the Low Countries. During Operation Pheasant, I Corps was unique in that it fielded multi national divisionsm - Polish 1st Armoured Division, the Canadian 4th Armoured Division the British 49th Polar Bears Division and the US 104th Timberwolf Division. After the Battle of the Scheldt I Corps Headquarters then took over administration of the 21st Army Group's logistics area around the port of Antwerp, Belgium until the end of the war.

Composition of I Corps in NW Europe Campaign
General Officer Commanding: Lieutenant-General John Crocker
 Corps troops:
 Inns of Court Regiment, Royal Armoured Corps (armoured cars)
 62nd (6th London) Anti-Tank Regiment, Royal Artillery
 102nd Light Anti-Aircraft Regiment, Royal Artillery
 9th Survey Regiment, RA
 I Corps Troops, Royal Engineers
 I Corps Signals, Royal Corps of Signals
Attached:
 4th Army Group, Royal Artillery
 150th (South Nottinghamshire Hussars) Regiment, Royal Horse Artillery (suspended animation January 1945)
 53rd (London) Medium Regiment, RA (209 & 210 (London) Batteries)
 65th (Highland) Medium Regiment, RA (222 (Fraserburgh) & 223 (Banffshire) Batteries)
 68th Medium Regiment, RA (233 & 234 Batteries)
 79th (Scottish Horse Yeomanry) Medium Regiment, RA
 51st (Lowland) Heavy Regiment, RA

Assignments of corps to armies, and divisions to corps, changed frequently during the campaign:

As of 6 June 1944
 British 3rd Infantry Division
 3rd Canadian Infantry Division
 6th Airborne Division

As of 7 July 1944
 British 3rd Infantry Division
 3rd Canadian Infantry Division
 51st (Highland) Infantry Division
 59th (Staffordshire) Infantry Division
 6th Airborne Division

As of 1 August 1944 (now part of First Canadian Army)
 51st (Highland) Infantry Division
 6th Airborne Division (returned to United Kingdom 3 September 1944)
 49th (West Riding) Infantry Division
 7th Armoured Division

British Army of the Rhine
After the defeat of Germany, the 21st Army Group became the British Army of the Rhine (BAOR), and 1 Corps, under the command of Lieutenant-General Ivor Thomas, was transformed into a corps district, with an administrative, rather than combat, role. It was disbanded in 1947.

However, in October 1951 the corps was reactivated to become the principal combat element of the BAOR, with its HQ based in Bielefeld. In March 1952, following the reactivation of 6th Armoured Division, its component formations were:
 2nd Infantry Division
 6th Armoured Division
 7th Armoured Division
 11th Armoured Division

Included as part of this was Canada's contribution to the NATO land forces in Germany. A Canadian mechanised brigade remained part of BAOR until 1970. The size of this force, 6,700, was such that it was referred to within British circles as a "light division".

4th Division was reformed from 11th Armoured Division on 1 April 1956. 

In a following 1958-60 reorganisation the Corps was formed into three mixed armour/infantry divisions including five brigade groups, which were in 1965 brought together into three centralised divisions (1st, 2nd, and 4th). In 1958, the "infantry" designation was dropped from the 2nd Infantry Division's title as part of this reorganisation. During the 1970s, 4th Division consisted of two "square" brigades.

With the end of National Service, manpower across the whole of BAOR dropped from around 77,000 to 55,000.

In the late 1970s the Corps was reorganised as four small five-battle-group armoured divisions plus a roughly brigade sized infantry 'Field Force'. It then comprised:
 1st Armoured Division
 2nd Armoured Division
 3rd Armoured Division
 4th Armoured Division - formed 1978 and served with I (BR) Corps with its headquarters at Hammersmith Barracks in Herford.
 5th Field Force

Following the 1981-3 reorganisation, the Corps consisted of 1st and 4th Armoured Divisions, which would have manned the front line against the anticipated attack by the Soviet 3rd Shock Army, plus in an in-depth, reserve role the 3rd Armoured Division and finally the 2nd Infantry Division which was tasked with rear-area security.
 1st Armoured Division
 7th Armoured Brigade
 12th Armoured Brigade
 22nd Armoured Brigade
 3rd Armoured Division
 4th Armoured Brigade
 6th Armoured Brigade
 33rd Armoured Brigade
 4th Armoured Division
 11th Armoured Brigade
 20th Armoured Brigade
 19th Infantry Brigade (in UK)
 2nd Infantry Division (in UK)
 15th Infantry Brigade (TA)
 24th Airmobile Brigade
 49th Infantry Brigade (TA)
 The Artillery Division (HQ Ripon Barracks, Bielefeld)
 

With the end of the Cold War, in 1992 1 (BR) Corps was disbanded, and its HQ closed. Some of the staff serving in HQ 1(BR) Corps were reassigned to the new HQ UK Support Command (Germany) which was formed from the rump of HQ BAOR. The remainder of the staff formed the British component (50% of the total staff in the HQ) in the Headquarters Allied Command Europe Rapid Reaction Corps (HQ ARRC), a newly instated multi-national NATO Rapid Reaction Corps HQ.  The Corps Commander reported to the Supreme Allied Commander Europe SACEUR, but had no troops under command except when assigned to ARRC by NATO member nations, for operations or for exercises. HQ ARRC moved to Rheindahlen in 1994.

General Officers Commanding
Commanders have included:
 1815 General The Prince of OrangeFrom 1901 to 1905 the commander of the troops at Aldershot was also commander 1st Army Corps 1 October 1901: General Sir Redvers Buller
 25 October 1901: Lieutenant-General Sir Henry Hildyard, temporary
 15 September 1902: Lieutenant-General Sir John French
 1914 Lieutenant-General Sir Douglas Haig
 1914–1915 Lieutenant-General Sir Charles Monro
 1915–1916 Lieutenant-General Sir Hubert Gough
 1916 Lieutenant General Charles Kavanagh
 1916 Major-General Havelock Hudson
 1916 Lieutenant-General Sir Charles Anderson
 1917 Major-General John Capper
 1917–1918 Lieutenant-General Arthur Holland
 1918 Major-General Sir Hugh Jeudwine
 1918 Lieutenant-General Sir Arthur HollandNote: I Corps was disbanded at the end of the First World War and reformed at the start of the Second World War 1939–1940 General Sir John Dill
 1940 Lieutenant-General Michael Barker
 1940 Lieutenant-General Harold Alexander
 1940–1941 Lieutenant-General Laurence Carr
 1941–1942 Lieutenant-General Henry Willcox
 1942–1943 Lieutenant-General Frederick Morgan
 Apr-Aug 1943 Lieutenant-General Gerard Bucknall
 1943–1945 Lieutenant-General John Crocker
 1945 Lieutenant-General Sidney Kirkman
 1945–1947 Lieutenant-General Ivor ThomasNote: I Corps was disbanded in June 1947 and reformed in late 1951 1951–1953 Lieutenant-General Sir Dudley Ward
 1953–1954 Lieutenant-General Sir James Cassels
 1954–1956 Lieutenant-General Sir Hugh Stockwell
 1956–1958 Lieutenant-General Sir Harold Pyman
 1958–1960 Lieutenant-General Sir Michael West
 1960–1962 Lieutenant-General Sir Charles Jones
 1962–1963 Lieutenant-General Sir Kenneth Darling
 1963–1966 Lieutenant-General Sir Richard Goodwin
 1966–1968 Lieutenant-General Sir John Mogg
 1968–1970 Lieutenant-General Sir Mervyn Butler
 1970–1972 Lieutenant-General Sir John Sharp
 1972–1974 Lieutenant-General Sir Roland Gibbs
 1974–1976 Lieutenant-General Sir Jack Harman
 1976–1978 Lieutenant-General Sir Richard Worsley
 1978–1980 Lieutenant-General Sir Peter Leng
 1980–1983 Lieutenant-General Sir Nigel Bagnall
 1983–1985 Lieutenant-General Sir Martin Farndale
 1985–1987 Lieutenant-General Sir Brian Kenny
 1987–1989 Lieutenant-General Sir Peter Inge
 1989–1991 Lieutenant-General Sir Charles Guthrie
 1991–1992 Lieutenant-General Sir Jeremy Mackenzie

Notes

References
 
 Dunlop, Colonel John K., The Development of the British Army 1899–1914, London, Methuen (1938).
 Ellis, John, The World War II Databook. BCA Publishing, 2003. CN 1185599.
 Forty, George, British Army Handbook 1939-1945, Sutton Publishing (1998).
 Hart, Stephen, Road To Falaise, Sutton Publishing (2004).
 Hofschroer, Peter, 1815: The Waterloo Campaign: Wellington, his German Allies and the Battles of Ligny and Quatre Bras, London: Greenhill Books (1998).
 Hofschroer, Peter, 1815: The Waterloo Campaign: The German Victory, London: Greenhill Books (1999).
 Isby, David, & Kamps, Charles Jr, Armies of NATO's Central Front, Jane's Publishing Company (1985).
 Brig E.A. James, British Regiments 1914–18, London: Samson Books, 1978, ISBN 0-906304-03-2/Uckfield: Naval & Military Press, 2001, ISBN 978-1-84342-197-9.
 JPS Cigarette card series, Army, Corps and Divisional Signs 1914–1918, John Player and sons, 1920s.
 
 Montgomery, Viscount, The Memoirs of Field-Marshal Montgomery, London: Collins (1958).
 Neillands,Robin The Great War Generals on the Western Front 1914-18, London: Robinson Publishing (1999).
 
 Official History 1914: Edmonds, Brigadier-General Sir James E., Military Operations France and Belgium, 1914, Volume I: Mons, the Retreat to the Seine, the Marne and the Aisne, August–October 1914 3rd revised edn 1933 (reprint Imperial War Museum, 1992).
 Official History 1915: Edmonds, Brigadier-General Sir James E., and Wynne, Capt G.C., Military Operations France and Belgium, 1915 Volume II: Battle of Aubers Ridge, Festubert, and Loos, London: Macmillan, 1928.
 Official History 1918: Edmonds, Brigadier-General Sir James E., Military Operations France and Belgium, 1918 Volume V: 26 September–11 November: The Advance to Victory 1947 (reprint Imperial War Museum, 1992).
 Official History 1939-40: Ellis, Major L.F., History of the Second World War, United Kingdom Military Series: The War in France and Flanders 1939-1940, London: HMSO, 1954.
 The National Archives, WO 171/258-260, I Corps HQ War Diaries, January - December 1944.
 Graham E. Watson & Richard A. Rinaldi, The Corps of Royal Engineers: Organization and Units 1889–2018'', Tiger Lily Books, 2018, .
 Williams, Mary H., (compiler), "U. S. Army in World War II, Chronology 1941-1945", Washington D.C.: Government Printing Office (1958).

External sources
 The Long Long Trail
 Official History 1939-40
 Royal Artillery 1939-45
 British Army Locations from 1945
 Regiments.org
 Late 70s-82 order of battle
 1989 order of battle

British field corps
Corps of the British Army in World War I
Corps of the British Army in World War II
Military units and formations disestablished in 1992